First Aid is a 1931 American pre-Code crime drama film directed by Stuart Paton. Produced by Ralph M. Like, the film was released on 5 July 1931 and was distributed by Sono Art-World Wide Pictures. First Aid was filmed in Santa Monica, California. Some scenes were filmed at the Bon Ton Ballroom.

Premise 
Ralph Ingram, a brain specialist whose alcoholism has ruined his career, tries to regain his reputation while working with an ambulance team. He is in love with Lil Hollins, who works as a taxi dancer, but Lil's boss, Michael Rush, is also in love with her.

Cast 
Grant Withers as Ralph Ingram
Marjorie Beebe as Lil Hollins
Wheeler Oakman as Michael Rush
Donald Keith as Buddy Hollins
William Desmond as the Chief of police
Paul Panzer as Whitey
Ernie Adams as Joe
George Chesebro as Swank
Harry Shutan as Jake
Billy Gilbert as Jenkins

Reception 
A positive review from The Film Daily on 12 July 1931 wrote: "Carries fast action punch with thrills and unique plot situation that makes popularfare good story treatment."

References

External links 
 
 

1931 films
1931 crime drama films
American black-and-white films
American crime drama films
Films directed by Stuart Paton
1930s English-language films
1930s American films
Films shot in California